The 2011 Copa Petrobras Montevideo was a professional tennis tournament played on clay courts. It was the eleventh edition of the tournament which was part of the 2011 ATP Challenger Tour. It took place in Montevideo, Uruguay between 14 and 20 November 2011.

ATP entrants

Seeds

 1 Rankings are as of November 7, 2011.

Other entrants
The following players received wildcards into the singles main draw:
  Martín Cuevas
  Tiago Fernandes
  Diego Hidalgo
  Nicolás Massú

The following players received entry from the qualifying draw:
  Alejandro Fabbri
  Renzo Olivo
  Diego Schwartzman
  Agustín Velotti

Champions

Singles

 Carlos Berlocq def.  Máximo González, 6–2, 7–5

Doubles

 Nikola Ćirić /  Goran Tošić def.  Marcel Felder /  Diego Schwartzman, 7–6(7–5), 7–6(7–4)

External links
Official Website
ITF Search
ATP official site

Copa Petrobras Montevideo
Clay court tennis tournaments
Tennis tournaments in Uruguay
Uruguay Open
2011 in Uruguayan tennis